Skalička is the name or former name of several village-municipalities in the Czech Republic:
 Skalička (Brno-Country District), in the South Moravian Region
 Skalička (Přerov District), in the Olomouc Region
 Skalka (Prostějov District), or fully "Skalka u Prostějova", formerly known as Skalička

It is also the surname of:
 Karel Skalička (1896–1979), a Czech-Argentinian chess master
 Vladimír Skalička (1909–1991), Czech linguist, polyglot, and member of the influential Prague School of linguists and literary critics in Prague